The 2017–18 Barangay Ginebra San Miguel season was the 39th season of the franchise in the Philippine Basketball Association (PBA).

Key dates

2017
October 29: The 2017 PBA draft took place in Midtown Atrium, Robinson Place Manila.
October 30: Jayjay Helterbrand officially announced his retirement after playing 17 seasons in the PBA, all of them with the Barangay Ginebra San Miguel franchise.

Draft picks

Roster

  Chua also serves as Barangay Ginebra's board governor.

Philippine Cup

Eliminations

Standings

Game log

|-bgcolor=ccffcc
| 1
| December 25
| Magnolia
| W 89–78
| Greg Slaughter (24)
| Greg Slaughter (12)
| LA Tenorio (8)
| Philippine Arena22,531
| 1–0

|-bgcolor=ccffcc
| 2
| January 7
| GlobalPort
| W 104–97 
| Japeth Aguilar (21)
| Cruz, Thompson (11)
| Scottie Thompson (8)
| Smart Araneta Coliseum9,000
| 2–0
|-bgcolor=ffcccc
| 3
| January 12
| Blackwater
| L 77–94
| Greg Slaughter (20)
| Slaughter, Thompson (10)
| LA Tenorio (6)
| Mall of Asia Arena
| 2–1
|-bgcolor=ffcccc
| 4
| January 21
| Alaska
| L 83–97
| Aljon Mariano (15)
| Aljon Mariano (9)
| Scottie Thompson (5)
| Ynares Center
| 2–2
|-bgcolor=ffcccc
| 5
| January 26
| Phoenix
| L 82–87
| Scottie Thompson (22)
| Scottie Thompson (13)
| LA Tenorio (5)
| Smart Araneta Coliseum
| 2–3
|-bgcolor=ccffcc
| 6
| January 28
| San Miguel
| W 100–96
| J. Aguilar, Tenorio (23)
| Scottie Thompson (10)
| Scottie Thompson (8)
| Smart Araneta Coliseum
| 3–3

|-bgcolor=ffcccc
| 7
| February 3
| NLEX
| L 78–81 
| Japeth Aguilar (21)
| Greg Slaughter (12)
| Scottie Thompson (7)
| Cuneta Astrodome
| 3–4
|-bgcolor=ccffcc
| 8
| February 7
| Kia
| W 103–77
| Greg Slaughter (14)
| Scottie Thompson (14)
| Scottie Thompson (7)
| Mall of Asia Arena
| 4–4
|-bgcolor=ccffcc
| 9
| February 11
| TNT
| W 93–78
| LA Tenorio (27)
| Greg Slaughter (14)
| LA Tenorio (11)
| Smart Araneta Coliseum
| 5–4
|-bgcolor=ffcccc
| 10
| February 18
| Meralco
| L 82–84
| Japeth Aguilar (20)
| Scottie Thompson (13)
| Scottie Thompson (5)
| Philippine Arena
| 5–5

|-bgcolor=ccffcc
| 11
| March 2
| Rain or Shine
| W 100–92 (3OT)
| Japeth Aguilar (30)
| Aguilar, Thompson (17)
| Joe Devance (7)
| Smart Araneta Coliseum
| 6–5

Playoffs

Bracket

Game log

|-bgcolor=ccffcc
| 1
| March 5
| Rain or Shine
| W 88–80
| LA Tenorio (18)
| Scottie Thompson (15)
| Scottie Thompson (7)
| Mall of Asia Arena
| 1–0
|-bgcolor=ccffcc
| 2
| March 7
| Rain or Shine
| W 99–91
| Japeth Aguilar (27)
| Japeth Aguilar (12)
| Mercado, Thompson (6)
| Smart Araneta Coliseum
| 2–0

|-bgcolor=ffcccc
| 1
| March 9
| San Miguel
| L 90–102
| J. Aguilar, Mercado, Thompson (17)
| Aljon Mariano (9)
| Kevin Ferrer (5)
| Smart Araneta Coliseum
| 0–1
|-bgcolor=ffcccc
| 2
| March 11
| San Miguel
| L 102–104 (OT)
| Japeth Aguilar (26)
| Scottie Thompson (9)
| LA Tenorio (7)
| Smart Araneta Coliseum
| 0–2
|-bgcolor=ccffcc
| 3
| March 13
| San Miguel
| W 95–87
| Japeth Aguilar (25)
| Japeth Aguilar (12)
| Scottie Thompson (6)
| Mall of Asia Arena
| 1–2
|-bgcolor=ffcccc
| 4
| March 15
| San Miguel
| L 81–102
| Japeth Aguilar (31)
| Japeth Aguilar (13)
| Devance, Ferrer (5)
| Mall of Asia Arena
| 1–3
|-bgcolor=ffcccc
| 5
| March 17
| San Miguel
| L 94–100
| Japeth Aguilar (34)
| Scottie Thompson (16)
| Scottie Thompson (16)
| Cuneta Astrodome
| 1–4

Commissioner's Cup

Eliminations

Standings

Game log

|-bgcolor=ffcccc
| 1
| April 29
| Rain or Shine
| L 89–108
| Japeth Aguilar (28)
| Japeth Aguilar (12)
| Charles García (8)
| Smart Araneta Coliseum
| 0–1

|-bgcolor=ffcccc
| 2
| May 6
| TNT
| L 92–96
| Aguilar, Devance (19)
| Aguilar, García (9)
| Scottie Thompson (4)
| Mall of Asia Arena
| 0–2
|-bgcolor=ccffcc
| 3
| May 11
| Blackwater
| W 105–91
| Kevin Ferrer (21)
| Aguilar, García (8)
| Scottie Thompson (6)
| Alonte Sports Arena
| 1–2
|-bgcolor=ffcccc
| 4
| May 20
| Phoenix
| L 98–103 (2OT)
| Japeth Aguilar (25)
| Charles García (18)
| LA Tenorio (8)
| Smart Araneta Coliseum
| 1–3
|- align="center"
|colspan="9" bgcolor="#bbcaff"|All-Star Break

|-bgcolor=ffcccc
| 5
| June 1
| Meralco
| L 82–93
| Justin Brownlee (20)
| Justin Brownlee (16)
| Justin Brownlee (12)
| Mall of Asia Arena
| 1–4
|-bgcolor=ffcccc
| 6
| June 3
| San Miguel
| L 97–104 (OT)
| Justin Brownlee (18)
| Scottie Thompson (15)
| Brownlee, Thompson (7)
| Mall of Asia Arena
| 1–5
|-bgcolor=ccffcc
| 7
| June 9
| NLEX
| W 93–85
| Justin Brownlee (23)
| Justin Brownlee (22)
| Justin Brownlee (7)
| Ibalong Centrum for Recreation
| 2–5
|-bgcolor=ccffcc
| 8
| June 17
| Magnolia
| W 104–84
| Justin Brownlee (35)
| Greg Slaughter (14)
| LA Tenorio (5)
| Smart Araneta Coliseum
| 3–5
|-bgcolor=ccffcc
| 9
| June 20
| Columbian
| W 134–107
| Justin Brownlee (24)
| Scottie Thompson (12)
| Tenorio, Thompson (10)
| Smart Araneta Coliseum
| 4–5
|-bgcolor=ccffcc
| 10
| June 24
| Alaska
| W 105–86
| Justin Brownlee (28)
| Justin Brownlee (9)
| Brownlee, Thompson (8)
| Smart Araneta Coliseum
| 5–5

|-bgcolor=ccffcc
| 11
| July 6
| GlobalPort
| W 116–98
| Justin Brownlee (36)
| Justin Brownlee (11)
| Scottie Thompson (11)
| Cuneta Astrodome
| 6–5

Playoffs

Bracket

Game log

|-bgcolor=ccffcc
| 1
| July 9
| Meralco
| W 88–81
| Justin Brownlee (25)
| Japeth Aguilar (10)
| Justin Brownlee (6)
| Smart Araneta Coliseum
| 1–0
|-bgcolor=ccffcc
| 2
| July 11
| Meralco
| W 104–90
| Justin Brownlee (36)
| Greg Slaughter (10)
| Justin Brownlee (9)
| Smart Araneta Coliseum
| 2–0

|-bgcolor=ccffcc
| 1
| July 15
| Rain or Shine
| W 102–89
| Justin Brownlee (35)
| Justin Brownlee (14)
| Justin Brownlee (9)
| Smart Araneta Coliseum
| 1–0
|-bgcolor=ffcccc
| 2
| July 19
| Rain or Shine
| L 100–109
| Justin Brownlee (29)
| Justin Brownlee (12)
| Mercado, Slaughter, Tenorio (4)
| Smart Araneta Coliseum
| 1–1
|-bgcolor=ccffcc
| 3
| July 21
| Rain or Shine
| W 75–72
| Justin Brownlee (44)
| Justin Brownlee (15)
| Scottie Thompson (8)
| Mall of Asia Arena
| 2–1
|-bgcolor=ccffcc
| 4
| July 23
| Rain or Shine
| W 96–94
| Devance, Slaughter (19)
| Justin Brownlee (17)
| Justin Brownlee (8)
| Smart Araneta Coliseum
| 3–1

|-bgcolor=ccffcc
| 1
| July 27
| San Miguel
| W 127–99
| Justin Brownlee (42)
| Brownlee, Slaughter (7)
| Justin Brownlee (9)
| Smart Araneta Coliseum11,883
| 1–0
|-bgcolor=ffcccc
| 2
| July 29
| San Miguel
| L 109–134
| Justin Brownlee (29)
| Scottie Thompson (7)
| LA Tenorio (7)
| Smart Araneta Coliseum15,042
| 1–1
|-bgcolor=ffcccc
| 3
| August 1
| San Miguel
| L 94–132
| Justin Brownlee (32)
| Justin Brownlee (11)
| Mercado, Thompson (4)
| Smart Araneta Coliseum
| 1–2
|-bgcolor=ccffcc
| 4
| August 3
| San Miguel
| W 130–100
| Justin Brownlee (37)
| Justin Brownlee (11)
| Scottie Thompson (8)
| Smart Araneta Coliseum12,288
| 2–2
|-bgcolor=ccffcc
| 5
| August 5
| San Miguel
| W 87–83
| Scottie Thompson (20)
| Greg Slaughter (13)
| Joe Devance (6)
| Smart Araneta Coliseum16,958
| 3–2
|-bgcolor=ccffcc
| 6
| August 8
| San Miguel
| W 93–77
| Justin Brownlee (31)
| Justin Brownlee (19)
| Justin Brownlee (7)
| Mall of Asia Arena20,490
| 4–2

Governors' Cup

Eliminations

Standings

Game log

|-bgcolor=ccffcc
| 1
| August 31
| Columbian
| W 96–84
| Justin Brownlee (34)
| Justin Brownlee (20)
| LA Tenorio (9)
| Smart Araneta Coliseum
| 1–0

|-bgcolor=ccffcc
| 2
| September 2
| Alaska
| W 109–101
| Justin Brownlee (45)
| Justin Brownlee (11)
| Brownlee, Thompson (9)
| Smart Araneta Coliseum
| 2–0
|-bgcolor=ccffcc
| 3
| September 5
| NorthPort
| W 104–98
| Justin Brownlee (27)
| Scottie Thompson (14)
| Justin Brownlee (8)
| Smart Araneta Coliseum
| 3–0
|-bgcolor=ffcccc
| 4
| September 21
| Blackwater
| L 118–124 (OT)
| Justin Brownlee (41)
| Scottie Thompson (11)
| Scottie Thompson (7)
| Smart Araneta Coliseum
| 3–1
|-bgcolor=ccffcc
| 5
| September 23
| San Miguel
| W 110–102
| Justin Brownlee (29)
| Justin Brownlee (19)
| Brownlee, Devance (7)
| Smart Araneta Coliseum
| 4–1
|-bgcolor=ccffcc
| 6
| September 29
| Phoenix
| W 101–99
| Justin Brownlee (34)
| Justin Brownlee (15)
| Brownlee, Thompson (6)
| Xavier University Gym
| 5–1

|-bgcolor=ccffcc
| 7
| October 5
| NLEX
| W 106–92
| Justin Brownlee (26)
| Justin Brownlee (12)
| Justin Brownlee (6)
| Smart Araneta Coliseum
| 6–1
|-bgcolor=ccffcc
| 8
| October 7
| Meralco
| W 111–105
| Aguilar, Brownlee (31)
| Scottie Thompson (11)
| Scottie Thompson (12)
| Sta. Rosa Multi-Purpose Complex
| 7–1
|-bgcolor=ffcccc
| 9
| October 13
| Rain or Shine
| L 97–104
| Justin Brownlee (23)
| Justin Brownlee (16)
| Justin Brownlee (9)
| Quezon Convention Center
| 7–2
|-bgcolor=ccffcc
| 10
| October 18
| Magnolia
| W 93–86
| Justin Brownlee (29)
| Justin Brownlee (12)
| Justin Brownlee (7)
| Smart Araneta Coliseum
| 8–2

|-bgcolor=ccffcc
| 11
| November 4
| TNT
| W 112–93
| Justin Brownlee (31)
| Justin Brownlee (16)
| Justin Brownlee (11)
| Smart Araneta Coliseum
| 9–2

Playoffs

Bracket

Game log

|-bgcolor=ccffcc
| 1
| November 6
| NLEX
| W 111–75
| Japeth Aguilar (18)
| Aguilar, Brownlee (10)
| Justin Brownlee (10)
| Smart Araneta Coliseum
| 1–0

|-bgcolor=ffcccc
| 1
| November 10
| Magnolia
| L 98–106
| Justin Brownlee (37)
| Justin Brownlee (14)
| Justin Brownlee (8)
| Ynares Center
| 0–1
|-bgcolor=ffcccc
| 2
| November 12
| Magnolia
| L 97–101
| Justin Brownlee (31)
| Scottie Thompson (15)
| Justin Brownlee (7)
| Smart Araneta Coliseum
| 0–2
|-bgcolor=ccffcc
| 3
| November 14
| Magnolia
| W 107–103
| Justin Brownlee (46)
| Justin Brownlee (19)
| Brownlee, Devance, Tenorio, Thompson (5)
| Smart Araneta Coliseum
| 1–2
|-bgcolor=ffcccc
| 4
| November 16
| Magnolia
| L 108–112
| Justin Brownlee (32)
| Japeth Aguilar (14)
| Scottie Thompson (8)
| Ynares Center
| 1–3

Transactions

Trades

Pre season

Commissioner's Cup

Recruited imports

Awards

References

Barangay Ginebra San Miguel seasons
Barangay Ginebra San Miguel, 2017-18